Dan Moor (born 24 July 1990) is a former Canadian rugby union player, who played Wing and Centre for the Canada national team. 
He played for the Toronto Arrows in Major League Rugby (MLR), joining from Yorkshire Carnegie.

Playing career

Ontario Blues

Oxford University
While studying for his Masters, Moor played for Oxford University in the 2017 Varsity Match.

Yorkshire Carnegie
On 14 August 2018, it was announced that Moor was being trialled at then-RFU Championship club, Yorkshire Carnegie. The trial was successful, and Moor was signed on 30 August for the 2018-19 season. Yorkshire finished the season 6th in the competition, with Moor scoring on his home debut.

Toronto Arrows & professional retirement
On 2 December 2018, the Toronto Arrows announced the signing of Dan Moor from Yorkshire Carnegie, returning Moor to his hometown, and into Major League Rugby. Over the 2019 season, Moor scored 7 tries over 13 appearances for the Arrows, including the first try for the Arrows on home soil in MLR, and was awarded with All-MLR Second XV honours. Despite his achievements, Moor was unsuccessful in being selected for Rugby Canada for the 2019 Rugby World Cup. Moor re-signed with the Arrows for the 2020 MLR season.

Moor was appointed as club captain for the Arrows, alongside Lucas Rumball as co-captain. Moor led for the first 4 games of the 2020 season, scoring 4 tries. When the season was cancelled, Moor was joint-second in the League try-scorers list.

On 24 June 2020, Moor announced his retirement from professional rugby. He stated that the time away from rugby caused by the COVID-19 pandemic gave him "time and space" to ponder his transition from rugby. He will take up a position with Bain & Company in November 2020, while maintaining an advisory role with the Arrows.

References

1990 births
Living people
Canadian expatriate sportspeople in England
Canadian rugby union players
Sportspeople from Toronto
Toronto Arrows players
Canada international rugby union players
Rugby union centres